James Skinner may refer to:

James Skinner (MP) (died 1558), MP for Reigate
James Skinner (missionary) (died 1821) English missionary and translator, see J. V. S. Taylor
James Skinner (East India Company officer) (1778–1841), Anglo-Indian soldier, founder of cavalry regiments, Skinner's Horse and 3rd Skinner's Horse
James Atchison Skinner (1826–1894), Scottish-born farmer, merchant and political figure in Ontario, Canada
James Scott Skinner (1843–1927), Scottish fiddler and dancing master
James Allen Skinner (1890–1974), British trade unionist and pacifist
Jimmy Skinner (footballer) (1898–1984), English footballer
Jimmy Skinner (1917–2007), Detroit Red Wings head coach
James John Skinner (1923–2008), Irish-born Zambian and Malawian jurist
James A. Skinner (born 1944), former CEO of McDonald's
James Skinner (CANZUK International) (fl. 2011–2018), executive director of CANZUK International
James L. Skinner (born 1953), American theoretical chemist